Seguin or Séguin is a given name and surname.

Seguin may also refer to:

Places
 Seguin, Kansas, United States, an unincorporated community
 Seguin, Texas, United States, a city and major suburb of San Antonio
 Seguin, Ontario, Canada
 Seguin River, Ontario, Canada
 Île Seguin (Seguin Island), in the Seine River in Paris
 Seguin Island, Maine, United States - see Seguin Light

Schools
 Seguin High School (Arlington, Texas), United States
 Seguin High School, Seguin Independent School District, Seguin, Texas, United States